George Frederick Oster (April 20, 1940 – April 15, 2018) was an American mathematical biologist, and Professor of Cell and Developmental Biology at University of California, Berkeley. He made seminal contributions to several varied fields including chaos theory, population dynamics, membrane dynamics and molecular motors. He was a 1985 MacArthur Fellow.

Early career 
He graduated from Columbia University, with a Ph.D., in Nuclear Engineering in 1967. He was appointed as an assistant professor in at UC Berkeley in 1970. In the early 1970s Oster collaborated with Aharon Katzir-Katchalsky on statistical mechanics.

Oster's work with E. O. Wilson on populations dynamics of social animals, particularly ants, is considered pioneering work in evolution in social insects. Oster was one of the first theoretical biologists to understand that a complex interplay between mechanical and chemical forces was at the root of most biological phenomena.

Later career 
He was elected to the National Academy of Sciences in 2004. Oster was a Guggenheim Fellow, and a member of the science board of the Santa Fe Institute.

Awards
1975 Guggenheim Fellowship
1984 MacArthur Fellows Program
1992 Weldon Memorial Prize
Winfree Prize for Mathematical Biology
Sackler International Prize in Biophysics

References

External links
"George Oster", Scientific Commons

1940 births
2018 deaths
Columbia School of Engineering and Applied Science alumni
University of California, Berkeley faculty
MacArthur Fellows
Theoretical biologists
Members of the United States National Academy of Sciences
Santa Fe Institute people
American biologists